Celebration is a biennial Tlingit, Haida and Tsimshian cultural event held during the first week of June in Juneau, Alaska, United States that occurs once every three years. 

First held in 1982, Celebration began as a way to pass on cultural knowledge to Native Alaskan children. The first event had 200 participants, and was mainly a dance festival. It has grown to be the largest cultural event in Alaska. 

It is sponsored and organized by the Sealaska Heritage Institute, the non-profit cultural arm of Sealaska Corporation. The 2012 Celebration was reported to have brought $2 million into the Juneau economy.

Festival 

The event consists of a five-day program of activities, starting with the Grand Entrance, a parade of all dance groups through Juneau and into Centennial Hall. Regular activities include workshops on the Tlingit, Haida, and Tsimshian language, Northwest Coast art, and Southeast Alaska Indian cultures and historical events; canoe racing; dance performances; film screenings; poetry gatherings; and a Native fashion show. The Celebration also sponsors traditional food contests, including soapberry and black seaweed, to introduce people to traditional Native foods and highlight the health benefits of these foods.

Native Artist Market 
The Native Artist Market supports Native artists and is open to only those artists who are members of federally recognized tribes and meet the requirement of the Indian Arts and Crafts Act of 1990, or Tlingit, Haida, Tsimshian who are Canadian citizens. Artists sell jewelry, masks, drums, dolls, decorative arts, and other handmade arts and crafts.

Art competition 
The Juried Art Show and Competition started in 2002 to showcase and encourage the production of Tlingit, Haida, and Tsimshian art. The art show also encouraged the development of new, contemporary art that was based on traditional forms, but this proved controversial. Contemporary Native artists were concerned that judges were biased in favor of "traditional" art, so contemporary art was recognized as its own category starting with the second show.

Baby Regalia Review 
The Baby Regalia Review started in 2006, as an opportunity to share with children their culture and heritage. During the review, each child is introduced by their European and Native names, tribal and clan membership, and the names of their parents and grandparents.

There was no Celebration in 2020 due to the COVID-19 pandemic.

The 2022 theme was "Celebrating 10,000 years of cultural survival." This was announced by Rosita Worl, president of Sealaska Heritage Institute. During that year's event, Juneau unveiled the first 360-degree totem pole in Alaska: the 22-foot-tall Sealaska Cultural Values Totem Pole. The structure, carved out of a 600-year-old cedar tree, "represents all three tribes of Southeast Alaska — Lingít, Haida and Tsimshian."

In popular culture 
In 2020, Celebration was featured as a plot point in the PBS animated series Molly of Denali, in the episode "Canoe Journey." The Gwichʼin protagonist and her family canoe to Juneau to attend the event, relying on traditional elder advice rather than maps. A local elder describes the route he took in his childhood including secret shortcuts, which aid the protagonists in their own expedition. The episode educates children about traditional Alaskan wayfinding.

See also
Pow wow
Alaska Native languages

References

External links
 

1982 establishments in Alaska
Alaska Native culture in Juneau
Culture of Juneau, Alaska
Dance festivals in the United States
Festivals established in 1982
Folk festivals in the United States
Haida
Music festivals established in 1982
Music festivals in Alaska
Native American music festivals
Native Americans in Alaska
Pow wows
Summer festivals
Tlingit culture
Tourist attractions in Juneau, Alaska
Tsimshian